Tropical Storm Ana was the first named storm of the 2015 Atlantic hurricane season. A pre-season system, it became the earliest United States–landfalling tropical cyclone on record. It developed as a subtropical cyclone from a non-tropical low north of the Bahamas, and intensified to attain peak winds of  before transitioning into a fully tropical cyclone early on May 9. Sustained in part by the warm waters of the Gulf Stream, Ana made landfall along the northeast coast of South Carolina early the next morning. Overall, damage from the storm was minor. Heavy rainfall and gusty winds affected parts of the Carolinas, and some vulnerable beaches endured coastal flooding and several feet of erosion. Gusty winds damaged trees and powerlines, causing sporadic power outages, and a weak tornado was reported in association with Ana. In North Carolina, two deaths—one direct and one indirect—were attributed to the storm.

Meteorological history

In the first week of May 2015, a strong cold front became stationary to the north of the Greater Antilles, where warm ocean waters dissipated the temperature gradient across the front. The western section of the front drifted westward as a surface trough of low pressure. Arriving at the Bahamas by May 5, the trough was attended by an expanse of showers and thunderstorms extending from the northwestern Caribbean Sea to southern Florida. A sharp mid- to upper-level trough interacted with the system and facilitated gradual cyclogenesis, and early on May 6, a distinct, non-tropical center of low pressure developed off southeastern Florida. Tracking slowly toward the north over the next two days, the system showed signs of increased organization, and a Hurricane Hunter aircraft found tropical storm-force winds to the north and west of the center on May 7. Due to its involvement with the upper-level trough, as well as its large wind field, the system was considered subtropical, as opposed to fully tropical.

The newly designated storm drifted toward the northwest, caught in an upper-air blocking pattern that yielded weak steering currents. Dry air within its circulation initially kept Ana weak, with sparse thunderstorm activity. However, the warm waters of the Gulf Stream, coupled with atmospheric instability resulting from cold temperatures aloft, enabled the formation of curved banding features near the storm's core. At the same time, the wind field contracted, indicating an imminent transition to a fully tropical storm.

Dry air and northwesterly wind shear plagued the system, keeping the strongest thunderstorms confined to the eastern side of the circulation. Despite an improved presentation on satellite and radar imagery on May 9, wind speeds remained about the same. That night, the storm accelerated slightly toward the north-northwest and gradually weakened as it approached land. Diminished by the cooler waters over the continental shelf, Ana made landfall along the coast of South Carolina, near North Myrtle Beach, at around 10:00 UTC on May 10.  Over land, the storm turned toward the north in advance of an approaching trough. It weakened to a tropical depression on the afternoon of May 10. The system maintained well-defined rainbands as it curved northeastward, passing through eastern North Carolina and into southeastern Virginia by the evening of May 11. After degenerating into a remnant low by 00:00 UTC on May 12, the system emerged off the coast of the Delmarva Peninsula back into the western Atlantic. Accelerating northeastward, the low passed south of New England and merged with a frontal system near Nova Scotia late on May 12.

Impact and records
Ana was the earliest Atlantic subtropical or tropical cyclone since 2003's Tropical Storm Ana, which formed on April 20. It was also the earliest tropical cyclone on record to make landfall in the United States. A storm in 1952 was thought to have made landfall as a tropical system much earlier, on February 3, but recent reanalysis efforts revealed that the storm was not fully tropical until after clearing Florida.

Immediately upon the storm's formation on May 8, a tropical storm watch was issued for coastal locations between Edisto Beach, South Carolina, and Cape Lookout, North Carolina. Early on May 8, the watch was upgraded to a tropical storm warning between the mouth of the South Santee River in South Carolina, and Surf City, North Carolina. The remainder of the watch north of Surf City was updated to a warning shortly thereafter. All tropical cyclone advisories were discontinued shortly after Ana made landfall.

The storm left road washouts in North Myrtle Beach, and worsened a long-term erosion problem along Cherry Grove Beach. Shifting volumes of sand in Surf City exposed the structure of the wrecked schooner William H. Sumner, which grounded in 1919 and is occasionally visible along the beach. On May 7, heightened swells in the Charleston Harbor drove a sailboat aground, forcing the Coast Guard to rescue the stricken vessel's two occupants. Rip currents from the storm pulled a swimmer underwater for over ten minutes off Oak Island; the man died of his injuries the next day.

Upon making landfall, Ana produced gusty winds and moderate to heavy rainfall in parts of the Carolinas. The storm's lopsided convection pattern yielded much higher rain totals to the north of its track than to the south, as a general  fell over eastern North Carolina and extreme northeastern South Carolina. Precipitation peaked at  near Kinston, while North Myrtle Beach recorded  of rain. A lake in North Myrtle Beach rose above its banks to inundate homes and local streets. The local fire department rescued several stranded individuals by boat when rising floodwaters isolated about 10 residences. Despite the sporadic cases of flooding, the rainfall was considered beneficial, having arrived during a typically dry part of the year.

Ana also caused crop damage and forced commercial growers to delay their planting dates. Near Richlands, North Carolina, gusty winds toppled a tree onto a roadway, causing a traffic accident that left one man dead. Another tree in the same area fell through the roof of a mobile home, and several flimsy structures sustained wind damage. Damage to electrical wires triggered scattered power outages in North Carolina. A waterspout developed on the Croatan Sound in one of the storm's outer bands, becoming a tornado as it moved over Roanoke Island. The tornado, rated EF0 on the Enhanced Fujita scale, brought down a few small trees and damaged the roof of a house.

See also

Other storms of the same name
List of North Carolina hurricanes
List of off-season Atlantic hurricanes
Subtropical Storm Andrea (2007)
Tropical Storm Beryl (2012)
Tropical Storm Bonnie (2016)
Tropical Storm Bertha (2020)

References

External links

The National Hurricane Center's advisory archive for Tropical Storm Ana
The Weather Prediction Center's Public Advisory Archive for Tropical Storm Ana

Ana (2015)
Ana (2015)
Ana (2015)
Ana (2015)
Ana (2015)
May 2015 events in the United States
Ana